Chen Manyuan (December 1911 – November 22, 1986) was a People's Republic of China politician. He was the 2nd Communist Party of China Committee Secretary of Guangxi (1957) as well as chairman of Guangxi (1953–1958). He was a member of the Central Advisory Commission and the 1st Chinese People's Political Consultative Conference. He was a delegate to the 1st National People's Congress and 3rd National People's Congress.

1911 births
1986 deaths
People's Republic of China politicians from Guangxi
Chinese Communist Party politicians from Guangxi
Political office-holders in Guangxi
Members of the Central Advisory Commission
Delegates to the 1st National People's Congress
Delegates to the 3rd National People's Congress
Members of the 1st Chinese People's Political Consultative Conference